Schwarzer Schöps is a river of Saxony, Germany. It is a right tributary of the Spree, which it joins northwest of Boxberg.

See also
List of rivers of Saxony

Rivers of Saxony
Rivers of Germany